One Way Out is an American reality television series that was produced by NorthSouth Productions for the Discovery Channel. The program stars escape artist Jonathan Goodwin, who performs difficult escape stunts. A pilot episode aired on April 14, 2008, and the series began a ten-part first season on January 26, 2009.

Premise
In the show, Jonathan goes to extremes to test the art and physics of escape. He is joined by chief collaborator Mikey Nelson and master builder/engineer Terry Stroud. Episode topics include:

To test what the body can do with minimal movement, Jonathan locks himself inside a box on top of a shaking washing machine with his body covered in 200,000 bees.
How does the force of spinning affect the body and the mind? Jonathan attempts to escape from a locked barrel pushed down a large hill and rolling at 126 revolutions per minute, spins on a chair at incredible speeds and then navigates barefoot through piles of broken glass, and withstands two Gs of force on his body courtesy of the Water Wheel of Doom.
While exploring the science and the pain associated with projectiles, Jonathan chains himself in a standing position as six tennis ball cannons pummel his body with balls flying at 45 mph; jumps into just 17 inches of water, mud and hay from a height of almost 20 feet; and becomes a human projectile himself by getting placed in a giant slingshot and launched over 65 feet in the air.

Episodes

References

External links
NorthSouth Productions

Discovery Channel original programming
2000s American reality television series
2008 American television series debuts
2009 American television series endings
American educational television series